Dead Man's Shoes may refer to:
 Dead Man's Shoes (1940 film), a British drama film directed by Thomas Bentley
 Dead Man's Shoes (2004 film), a British psychological thriller film
 Dead Man's Shoes (FM album), 1995
 Dead Man's Shoes (Lucky Bullets album), 2012
 "Dead Man's Shoes" (The Twilight Zone), a 1962 episode of the American television anthology series The Twilight Zone